is the railway station in Nagayo, Nishisonogi District, Nagasaki Prefecture, Japan. It is operated by JR Kyushu and is on the Nagasaki Main Line.

Lines
Only local trains run on this branch.

Station layout 
The station consists of a side platform serving a single track on an embankment. A small station building houses a staffed ticket window and waiting area at the base of the embankment from which a covered flight of steps leads to the platform where a shelter is provided for waiting passengers. The station is equipped with a SUGOCA card reader.

Management of the station has been outsourced to the JR Kyushu Tetsudou Eigyou Co., a wholly owned subsidiary of JR Kyushu specialising in station services. It staffs the ticket window which is equipped with a POS machine but does not have a Midori no Madoguchi facility.

Adjacent stations

History
JR Kyushu opened the station on 1 March 1994 as an additional station on the existing track of the old or Nagayo branch of the Nagasaki Main Line.

Passenger statistics
In fiscal 2016, the station was used by an average of 462 passengers daily (boarding passengers only), and it ranked 252nd  among the busiest stations of JR Kyushu.

Environs
Nagayo Town Nagayo Minami Elementary School
Nagasaki Prefectural Hokuyōdai High School - 5 Minutes on foot
Nagasaki Prefectural Road Route 33

References

External links
Kōda Station (JR Kyushu)

Railway stations in Nagasaki Prefecture
Nagasaki Main Line
Railway stations in Japan opened in 1994